"Why We Drink" is a song recorded by American country music singer Justin Moore. It is the second single from his fifth studio album, 2019's Late Nights and Longnecks. Moore co-wrote the song with David Lee Murphy, Casey Beathard, and Jeremy Stover, who also produced it.

Content
The song is a list of reasons that one may give to consume alcoholic beverages. According to Moore, the idea for the song came when at a bar with his mother. She asked him "why do you drink so much?" and he responded that he had never found a reason not to drink. Moore then presented the idea to Jeremy Stover, his record producer, who helped him write the song with David Lee Murphy and Casey Beathard.

Music video
Cody Villalobos directed the song's music video, which was shot in Moore's hometown of Poyen, Arkansas. Moore's mother also appears in the video, which features him participating in recreational activities such as riding horses and drinking around a bonfire.

Chart performance

Weekly charts

Year-end charts

Certifications

References

2019 singles
2019 songs
Justin Moore songs
Big Machine Records singles
Songs written by Justin Moore
Songs written by Jeremy Stover
Songs written by David Lee Murphy
Songs written by Casey Beathard
Songs about alcohol
Song recordings produced by Jeremy Stover